Churn may refer to:

 Churn drill, large-diameter drilling machine large holes appropriate for holes in the ground

Dairy-product terms 
 Butter churn, device for churning butter
 Churning (butter), the process of creating butter out of milk or cream
 Milk churn, container for milk transportation

 Chuck Churn (born 1930), Major League Baseball pitcher in 1957–1959

Geography 
 Devils Churn, Pacific inlet in Lincoln County, Oregon, U.S.
 England:
 River Churn, river running through Gloucestershire
 Churn railway station (inactive)
 British Columbia, Canada:
 Churn Creek
 Churn Creek Provincial Park, in Churn Creek Protected Area

Music 
 Churn (Shihad album), 1993
 Churn (Seven Mary Three album), 1994

Business 
 Product churning, a business practice whereby more of the product is sold than is beneficial to the consumer
 Churning (stock trade), the excessive buying and selling of a client's stocks by a trader to generate large commission fees
 Churn rate, a measure of the number of individuals or items moving into or out of a collective over a specific period of time.

Technology 
 Churning (cipher), an encryption function used in the ITU G.983.1 standard.

Other
 Manthan, an Indian word meaning churn